Darren Middleton (born 28 December 1978) is an English former professional footballer who played as a forward.

Career
Middleton started his career with English Premier League side Aston Villa, where he made one appearance. On 23 December 1995, he debuted for Aston Villa during a 1–0 loss to QPR. In 2000, Middleton signed for Stafford Rangers in the English sixth tier after receiving an offer from Spanish La Liga club Málaga.

Before the second half of 2000–01, he signed for Forest Green Rovers in the English fifth tier. In 2001, he signed for English sixth tier team Worcester City.

References

External links
 

Living people
1978 births
Sportspeople from Lichfield
English footballers
Association football forwards
Premier League players
National League (English football) players
Southern Football League players
Aston Villa F.C. players
Forest Green Rovers F.C. players
Stafford Rangers F.C. players
Worcester City F.C. players